Macrozamia cardiacensis is a species of plant in the family Zamiaceae. It is endemic to Australia.

References

cardiacensis
Flora of Queensland
Cycadophyta of Australia
Endemic flora of Australia
Nature Conservation Act rare biota
Vulnerable biota of Queensland
Rare flora of Australia
Vulnerable flora of Australia
Taxonomy articles created by Polbot
Taxa named by Paul Irwin Forster
Taxa named by David L. Jones (botanist)